Self Portrait is the fourth overall album from singer Lalah Hathaway. The title and release date of the album were announced in Hathaway's official MySpace page in March 2008.

Reviews

According to Bebo.com, the album will feature additional production contributions from Rex Rideout who was responsible for Hathaway's most recent #1 single, a 2004 cover of Luther Vandross' "Forever, For Always, For Love." Other producers include Paula Gallitano, Kenneth Crouch, and Terrace Martin. Martin notably worked on Snoop Dogg's Ego Trippin''' album. Self Portrait'' also features contributions from singer/songwriters Sandra St. Victor (who performed with Hathaway on the Daughters of Soul tour), and underground soul singer Rahsaan Patterson.

Singles
The midtempo lead single "Let Go" produced by Rideout impact radio stations on April 21, 2008. The single, co-produced by Hathaway, also features Rahsaan Patterson on background vocals. The album's second single "That Was Then" was released in late 2008. The song debut at #105 on the Hot R&B charts.

Promotion
After the release of Self Portrait, Hathaway went on tour, which began in July 2009. In January 2009, Hathaway appeared on BETJ in an interview and performing before an audience.

Track listing

References

2008 albums
Lalah Hathaway albums
Albums produced by Terrace Martin